Macropodiformes is an suborder of Australian marsupial mammals. Members of this suborder are called macropodiformes, and include kangaroos, wallabies, bettongs, potoroos, and rat-kangaroos. Macropodiformes is one of three suborders that form the order Diprotodontia, the largest extant order of marsupials. They are found in Australia and New Guinea, and are generally found in forests, shrublands, grasslands, and savannas, though some species can also be found in deserts and rocky areas. They range in size from the musky rat-kangaroo, at  plus a  tail, to the red kangaroo, at  plus a  tail. Macropodiformes primarily eat leaves, grass, ferns, and shrubs, as well as fruit and other plant material.

Many macropodiformes do not have population estimates, but the ones that do range from 40 members to 500,000. Ten species are categorized as endangered species: Calaby's pademelon, Cape York rock-wallaby, dingiso, Goodfellow's tree-kangaroo, ifola, Matschie's tree-kangaroo, mountain pademelon, nabarlek, northern bettong, and Proserpine rock-wallaby. A further six species are categorized as critically endangered: the black dorcopsis,  Gilbert's potoroo, golden-mantled tree-kangaroo, tenkile, Wondiwoi tree-kangaroo, and woylie. Eight species have been made extinct in the modern era, all between the 1880s and the 1940s after the colonization of Australia began: the broad-faced potoroo, crescent nail-tail wallaby, desert bettong, desert rat-kangaroo, eastern hare-wallaby, Lake Mackay hare-wallaby, Nullarbor dwarf bettong, and toolache wallaby.

The seventy-two extant species of Macropodiformes are divided into three families: Hypsiprymnodontidae, containing a single species, the musky rat-kangaroo; Macropodidae, containing sixty-three species divided between the twelve genera in the subfamily Macropodinae and the single genus of the subfamily Sthenurinae; and Potoroidae, containing eight species in three extant genera. Dozens of extinct Macropodiformes species have been discovered, though due to ongoing research and discoveries the exact number and categorization is not fixed.

Conventions

Conservation status codes listed follow the International Union for Conservation of Nature (IUCN) Red List of Threatened Species. Range maps are provided wherever possible; if a range map is not available, a description of the macropodiformes's range is provided. Ranges are based on the IUCN Red List for that species unless otherwise noted. All extinct genera, species, or subspecies listed alongside extant species went extinct after 1500 CE, and are indicated by a dagger symbol "".

Classification
The suborder Macropodiformes consists of three extant families: Hypsiprymnodontidae, Macropodidae, and Potoroidae. Hypsiprymnodontidae contains a single species and Potoroidae contains eight species in three extant genera. Macropodidae is divided into two subfamilies: Macropodinae, containing sixty-three species divided between twelve genera, and Sthenurinae, containing a single species. In addition to the extant species, eight species—four in Macropodidae and four in Potoroidae, including one extinct genus—have been made extinct in the modern era, all between the 1880s and the 1940s after the colonization of Australia began.

Family Hypsiprymnodontidae
 Genus Hypsiprymnodon (musky rat-kangaroo): one species

Family Macropodidae
 Subfamily Macropodinae
 Genus Dendrolagus (tree-kangaroos): fourteen species
 Genus Dorcopsis (dorcopsises): four species
 Genus Dorcopsulus (forest wallabies): two species
 Genus Lagorchestes (hare-wallabies): four species (two extinct)
 Genus Macropus (grey kangaroos): two species
 Genus Notamacropus (wallabies): eight species (one extinct)
 Genus Osphranter (kangaroos): four species
 Genus Onychogalea (nail-tail wallabies): three species (one extinct)
 Genus Petrogale (rock-wallabies): sixteen species
 Genus Setonix (quokka): one species
 Genus Thylogale (pademelon): seven species
 Genus Wallabia (swamp wallaby): one species
 Subfamily Sthenurinae
 Genus Lagostrophus (banded hare-wallaby): one species

Family Potoroidae
 Genus Aepyprymnus (rufous rat-kangaroo): one species
 Genus Bettongia (bettongs): six species (two extinct)
 Genus Caloprymnus (desert rat-kangaroo): one species (one extinct)
 Genus Potorous (potoroos): four species (one extinct)

Macropodiformes
The following classification is based on the taxonomy described by the reference work Mammal Species of the World (2005), with augmentation by generally accepted proposals made since using molecular phylogenetic analysis, as supported by both the IUCN and the American Society of Mammalogists.

Hypsiprymnodontidae

Macropodidae

Subfamily Macropodinae

Subfamily Sthenurinae

Potoroidae

References

Sources

 
 
 
 
 
 
 
 

macropodiformes
macropodiformes
macropodiformes